Donbas strategic offensive may refer to:
 Donbas strategic offensive (July 1943), a failed offensive by the Soviet Union to retake the Donbas from Nazi Germany
 Donbas strategic offensive (August 1943), an offensive in which the Soviet Union succeeded in expelling Nazi Germany from the Donbas